Yegor Zamula (born 30 March 2000) is a Russian professional ice hockey defenceman currently playing for the  Philadelphia Flyers of the National Hockey League (NHL).

Early life 
Zamula began playing ice hockey at the age of two, and says that his favorite player as a child was Victor Hedman.

Playing career

Amateur 
The Regina Pats of the Western Hockey League (WHL) selected Zamula 60th overall in the CHL Import Draft. After 38 games with the Pats, Zamula was placed on waivers, where he was claimed by the Calgary Hitmen.

Professional 
Zamula made his NHL debut on 27 April 2021, playing on a defensive line with Travis Sanheim in a game against the New Jersey Devils. He became the fifth Flyer to debut during the 2020–21 NHL season, following Maksim Sushko, Tanner Laczynski, Wade Allison, and Jackson Cates.

International play

Zamula represented Russia at the 2020 World Junior Ice Hockey Championships, where he averaged 22:23 of ice time per game, the most of any player for Russia, Canada, the US, Sweden, or Finland. He scored 2 goals and 3 assists in 7 games with Russia, who eventually lost the gold medal match to Canada.

Career statistics

Regular season and playoffs

International

References

External links
 

2000 births
Living people
Regina Pats players
Calgary Hitmen players
Philadelphia Flyers players
Lehigh Valley Phantoms players
Russian expatriate ice hockey people
Russian expatriate sportspeople in the United States
Russian ice hockey defencemen
Sportspeople from Chelyabinsk
Undrafted National Hockey League players